Jessica Caro García (born 20 July 1988) is a Colombian footballer who plays as a midfielder for Generaciones Palmiranas and the Colombia women's national team.

International career
Caro made her senior debut for Colombia during the 2018 Copa América Femenina.

References

1988 births
Living people
Women's association football midfielders
Colombian women's footballers
Colombia women's international footballers
Pan American Games gold medalists for Colombia
Pan American Games medalists in football
Footballers at the 2019 Pan American Games
Medalists at the 2019 Pan American Games
21st-century Colombian women